Gillian Patterson (born 26 September 1963) is a former British archer.

Career 

Patterson joined Cleadon Archers. In 1976 Patterson became a senior Master Bowman at the age of thirteen. She was selected for the Great British archery team in 1979 and competed in the World Archery Championships the same year and finished 28th.

At the 1980 Summer Olympic Games she took part in the women's individual event and
finished 22nd with 2216 points scored.

References

External links 
 Profile on worldarchery.org

1963 births
British female archers
Olympic archers of Great Britain
Archers at the 1980 Summer Olympics
Living people
20th-century British women